The Lithuanian Navy is the naval arm of the Lithuanian Armed Forces. Though formally established on 1 August 1935 its roots stretch back as far as naval engagements on the Baltic Sea in the Medieval period. Lithuanian naval units saw some service with Soviet naval forces during World War II, and the navy has been re-established in its own right and continues to expand since Lithuania's independence in 1990.

History 

Although the origin of the Lithuanian Navy dates back to the period between World War I and World War II, the history of the involvement in naval battles existed earlier. The Baltic tribe of Aistians that settled down in the Baltic Sea shore built ships and used them for trade as well as for military purposes. Furthermore, according to annals, in the 13th century other Baltic tribes, the Coronians and Samogitians, tried to destroy the castle of Riga coming by ships. It is also known about the Lithuanians’ victory in the ship battle in Nemunas River at the time when Duke Vytenis ruled the Duchy of Lithuania. The most known and important naval victory was achieved by great hetman Jan Karol Chodkiewicz on 24 March 1609 near Salismünde (now Salacgrīva in Latvia) where he defeated a Swedish fleet burning two enemy ships and losing none and hence breaking the blockade of Riga city. But generally the loss of territories near the Baltic Sea had a negative impact on Lithuania's maritime development.

Polish–Lithuanian Commonwealth Navy 
The Commonwealth Navy was small and played a relatively minor role in the history of the Commonwealth. Despite having access to the Baltic Sea, neither Poland nor Lithuania had any significant navy throughout their histories.

Vasa's plans for fleet creation 
At the turn of the seventeenth century, Poland became ruled by the House of Vasa, and was involved in a series of wars with Sweden (see also dominium maris baltici). Vasa kings attempted to create a proper fleet, but their attempts met with repeated failures, due to lack of funds in the royal treasury (Polish nobility saw little need for the fleet and refused to raise taxes for its construction, and Gdańsk continued its opposition to the idea of a royal fleet). During the reign of Sigismund III, the most celebrated victory of the Commonwealth Navy under command of Admiral Arend Dickmann took place at the Battle of Oliwa in 1627 against Sweden, during the Polish-Swedish War. The victory over Sweden secured for Poland permanent access to the Atlantic, and laid the foundations for expeditions beyond Europe. The plans for the independent fleet fell through shortly afterwards due to a badly executed alliance with the Habsburgs who in 1629 took over the fleet.

The Commission of Royal Ships (Komisja Okrętów Królewskich) was created in 1625. This commission, along with the ultimate allocation of funds by the Sejm in 1637, attempted to create a permanent Commonwealth Navy. Władysław IV Waza who took the throne in 1632 bought 12 ships, and built a dedicated port for the royal navy (Władysławowo).

Władysław IV and plans for Navy expansion 

The 58th article signed and sworn by king Władysław IV Pacta conventa announced creation of a war fleet "according to needs of Commonwealth". Władysław, taking the throne after his father Sigismund III Vasa died in 1632, was in favour of expanding and modernising the Commonwealth military. One of his plans was the expansion of the Commonwealth Navy.

Despite his attempts he did not recover ships taken by Swedes in Wismar and Travemuende. Władysław decided to build a new fleet and created a "Naval Commission" with Gerard Denhoff as a chairman to fulfill this task. The choice of other members of this Commission was not random, it contained wealthy king supporters, like the merchant and owner of a merchant fleet from Danzig, Georg Hewel (Gdańsk, Jerzy Hewel). Because the Sejm (Polish Diet) was at best reluctant to pay for new ships and royal chest was permanently empty it was due to Hewel that the new fleet was created at all. He gave to the king's disposal 10 ships, a few of them were carrying small caliber cannons. These ships had to be modernized in order to allow them to carry heavier cannons. Additionally the king wanted to build a few galleons in Danzig and Puck and because of long construction times, also to purchase a few ships abroad, but those plans were not realized (except of purchase of one Danish ship - requiring quite serious repair).

Thus the new 'Polish fleet' consisted of 10 ex-merchant ships: "Czarny Orzeł" (Black Eagle – 420 tons, 32 cannons), "Prorok Samuel" (Prophet Samuel – 400 tons, 24 cannons), "Wielkie Słońce" (Great Sun – 540 tons, 24 cannons), "Nowy Czarny Orzeł" (New Black Eagle – 24 cannons). Four smaller ships "Biały Orzeł" (White Eagle), "Charitas", "Gwiazda" (Star) and "Strzelec" (Saggitarius) had 200 tons and two the smallest "Święty Piotr" (Saint Peter) or "Fortuna" (Fortune) 160 tons and "Mały Biały Orzeł" (Small White Eagle) 140 tons and 4 small caliber cannons and additionally one small galley. Command of the newly created fleet was given to rear admiral Aleksander Seton.

The King did not forget to ensure a safe base for the newly created fleet. The Harbor in Puck was too shallow for the biggest ships and the usage of Wisłoujście (a fortress near Gdansk) was constantly plagued by difficulties from the Danzig Patricians (afraid that a king with a strong naval arm would step upon their "liberties", control tolls, exert taxes etc.). The royal engineers Friederich Getkant (Fryderyk Getkant), Jan Pleitner and Eliasz Arciszewski selected a location for two new fortifications with naval bases on the Hel peninsula. They were quite impressive and raised in record time (finished in 1634, consisting of strong wooden (oak) palisades, earthen walls, trenches and moats). These fortifications were named after the King and his brother: Władysławowo and Kazimierzowo (the small town of Władysławowo still exists on the Hel peninsula nowadays - the fort was more or less on its current edge).

Additionally about 500 Cossacks under Konstanty Kołek with their small boats (Chaika) were brought. It is uncertain if they were used at all. Their main goal was to plague Swedish communication and supply lines near Piława and on Zatoka Wiślana (Vistula Bay). There were plans to use Cossacks in their light but very fast boats against Inflanty (Livonia) and even to raid the Swedish shore (to burn, pillage, capture merchant ships etc.). Cossacks were known from their plundering raids on Black Sea (they even burned suburbs of Istanbul once or twice). Because of the overall tonnage and armament difference between Polish and Swedish naval fleets even before (in 1620s), the main role of the Polish fleet was to disrupt Swedish communication and supply lines, to capture merchant ships bringing supplies for the Swedes (even if they belonged to neutral powers, for example ships belonging to the Netherlands, England or German duchies/cities were captured and sequestrated).

The king's plan never had strong support from Polish nobles (szlachta): high costs and reluctance to strengthen the king's power were always crippling Władysław's plans. Thus not even all the king's expenses for the modernization of those ten ships were fully repaid. Unfortunate international alliances (with Denmark and Muscovy) did not allow him to mount any offensive actions and the majority of the wars he participated in were defensive ones (like the Smolensk War with Muscovy in 1634). A new armistice with Sweden signed in Stumsdorf (Sztumska Wies) knocked the last argument out of the king's hand. After that the king wanted to use his ships to organize the first Polish merchant company (with help of Hewel), however Hewel's death stopped even those plans. Finally the ships were sold. The built fortifications were salt in Denmark's and the Danzig Patriciate eyes and under their pressure were destroyed in 1640s.

The Swedes were without king after the death of Gustavus Adolphus of Sweden and lost battles in Germany. The Polish nobles did not want to fight a new war so when the Swedes returned most of the lands they captured in the previous war, a new armistice for 35 years was signed. The cost of the Polish preparations for this war was comparable with the costs of the king's relief of Smolensk in 1634 and his campaign against Muscovy.

Commonwealth fleet after 1630s 
The fleet was destroyed in 1637 by Denmark, without declaration of war.

The remaining ships were sold in the years 1641-1643, which marked the end of the Commonwealth Navy.

Ships of the Polish–Lithuanian Commonwealth Navy 
Ritter Sankt Georg (Rycerz Święty Jerzy) ("Knight St George") – galleon, 31 guns, 400t under the command of Johann Storch
Fliegender Hirsch (Latający Jeleń) ("Flying Deer") – galleon, 20 guns, 300t under the command of Ellert Appelman
Meerweib (Panna Wodna) ("Sea Virgo") – 12 guns, 160t under the command of Adolf von Arzen
Schwarzer Rabe (Czarny Kruk) ("Black Raven") – 16 guns, 260t under the command of Alexander Bley
Gelber Löwe (Żółty Lew) ("Yellow Lion") – 10 guns, 120t under the command of Hans Kizer
Meermann (Wodnik) ("Aquarius") – galleon, 17 guns, 200t under the command of Hermann Witte
König David (Król Dawid) ("King David") – galleon, 31 guns, 400t, under James Murray (known to the Poles as Jakub Mora)
Arche Noah (Arka Noego) ("Noah's Ark") – 16 guns, 180t under the command of Magnus Wesman
Weißer Löwe (Biały Lew) ("White Lion") – 8 guns, 200t under the command of Peter Böse
Feuerblase (Płomień) ("Fireblaze") – 18 guns, 240t

1935-1939

After World War I, the Government of Lithuania attempted to establish a maritime defense force. However, due to various political and economical reasons, the maritime defense force was only partially implemented. In 1923, Lithuania gained the control of Klaipėda harbor and gradual development of the maritime defense force started. The purchase of a minesweeper in 1927 was one of the first significant steps to implement Lithuanian Government aims. The ship was commissioned as the training ship  (President Smetona). Captain Antanas Kaskelis was assigned as ship's commanding officer. Several small boats carried out patrol duties (Coast Guard 3-6 cutter) and one small yacht in Klaipėda harbor. Naval officers were educated abroad. On 1 August 1935, the commander in chief of the Lithuanian Armed Forces, General Stasys Rastikis, officially established the Lithuanian Navy as a branch of the Lithuanian Armed Forces.

World War II 

Before the beginning of World War II on 22 March 1939 the region of Klaipėda was occupied by Germany. Once the war started Lithuanian naval ships were forced to leave Klaipėda for Liepāja harbor in Latvia. During the Soviet occupation, 3 Russian boats blocked ship Prezidentas Smetona in Sventoji harbor (1940). The Lithuanian Navy was attached to the Soviet Union's Baltic maritime defense force. Prezidentas Smetona was renamed Korall and participated in the sea battles against Nazi Germany's Kriegsmarine. On 11 January 1945, the ship triggered a mine and sank in the Gulf of Finland.

1992-2006
After the declaration of independence on 11 March 1990, Lithuania had to re-establish its sovereignty as well as organize the state's defense system, which formed the Lithuanian Armed Forces. On 4 July 1992 the Lithuanian Navy was re-established. Juozapas Algis Leisis was appointed as commander of the Coast Guard Squadron.

The first commissioned ship in the Lithuanian Navy was the A41 Vėtra. Vėtra belongs to the Klaipeda harbour administration. The Vėtra is used for SAR and supply operations. In 1992, the Lithuanian Navy received two , Zemaitis (F11) and Aukstaitis (F12) from Russia. After the crew training period in June 1992 both corvettes participated in the international military exercise US Baltops 93. This marked the beginning of Lithuanian cooperation with international navies.

In the period spanning 1992-2000 the Lithuanian Navy received 3 Storm-class patrol ships from Norway, two Lindau-class mine-hunters from Germany, a cutter (ex-Vilnele 1983) from the Klaipeda harbor administration, and a tug and dive cutter Lokys from Sweden.

Another milestone in Lithuanian naval history was the establishment of the Sea Coastal Surveillance Company in 1993 which was then transformed into the Sea Coastal Surveillance Service. On 1 April 2004, Lithuania became an official member of the NATO alliance. Currently the Lithuanian naval forces are undergoing rapid modernization.

Modern 
 

In 2006 Lithuanian Navy received Ex-HNoMS Vidar (N52) from the Royal Norwegian Navy. The navy used Jotvingis (N42) as a command-and-supply ship. Vetra was later decommissioned and scrapped. Jotvingis took part with the Air Defence Forces exercises, being used as a launch platform for the RT-400 SAM missile.

In the period spanning 2008-2016 the Navy bought 4 Flyvefisken-class patrol ships from Denmark which received the names P11 Žemaitis, P12 Dzūkas, P14 Aukštaitis, and P15 Sėlis. This led to the decommissioning and later scrapping of the Grisha-class corvettes.

The Navy received Šakiai which was transferred from the Klaipeda harbour administration In 2013 the Navy commissioned ex-HMS Cottesmore and ex-HMS Dulverton. The vessels received the names M53 Skalvis and M54 Kuršis. Both are used in the Mine Countermeasures Squadron.

In May 2020, it was reported that the procurement of a third Hunt-class minehunter for the Lithuanian Navy was approved by the UK defense ministry. In April 2022, it was announced the Navy will acquire Jehu-class patrol boats from Finland.

Function 

Main tasks of the Lithuanian Naval Force are:
Control, protect and defend territorial sea and exclusive economic zone of the Republic of Lithuania.
Underwater, surface surveillance and control of territorial waters.
Mine-clearing operations.
Anti-terrorism activities at sea.
Protection and control of shipping and sea line of communications.
SAR operations.

Fleet

Current

Retired

Ranks and insignia

Officers
The rank insignia for commissioned officers for the navy.

Enlisted
The rank insignia for enlisted personnel for the navy.

References

Sources

External links 

Lithuanian Naval Force official webpage

Sources 
 Lithuanian Ministry of Defence site

 
1935 establishments in Lithuania